The 2007 Melbourne Storm season was the 10th in the club's history. They competed for NRL's 2007 Telstra Premiership, finishing the season in 1st place to claim the minor premiership before going on to reach the 2007 NRL grand final, their third. In the grand final the Storm defeated the Manly-Warringah Sea Eagles to claim their second premiership. However two years after the event Melbourne were stripped of their 2007 titles after being found guilty of long-term salary cap breaches.

The most successful season in the club's history as the team managed 21 wins on their way to winning the NRL Grand Final. Storm's success was built on the back of incredibly strong defence. Craig Bellamy's men conceded just 11.5 points per game, the best defensive season in the club's history. The year began with seven straight wins and by Round 12 Melbourne had moved into first place, where they remained for the rest of the season. Storm earned redemption from the 2006 Grand Final loss by beating the Broncos 40–0 in the Qualifying final. They faced Manly in the decider, running away with a 34–8 victory as Greg Inglis scored a double on the night to be awarded the Clive Churchill Medal. Cameron Smith increased his standing as the best player in the game by being awarded the Golden Boot after being named the International Player of the Year while Israel Folau set an NRL rookie record, scoring 21 tries for the season.

Season Summary
 15 January – The drawn-out battle over the services of Melbourne er Steve Turner is finally resolved when new NRL team the Gold Coast Titans agree to release him from his contract. "It would have been devastating [to leave]," Turner said. "I feel like I’ve come all this way with the Storm and leaving now would have been really hard to handle." Storm rookies Smith Samau and Daniel Isaac are 'traded' to the Titans as compensation for the loss of Turner.
 3 March – In the club's first trial match played in metropolitan Melbourne, Storm thrash 2006 premiers Brisbane Broncos 46–0 in a well-attended game at the club's training base Princes Park.
 Round 1 – Israel Folau becomes the youngest player to play for the club, making his debut at just 17 years and 347 days. Folau scores a try in a tight 18–16 win against Wests Tigers, with the goalkicking of Cameron Smith proving the difference on the scoreboard.
 Round 5 – Melbourne get off to their best start to a season, winning their fifth straight game.
 Round 6 – Playing his second game in 24 hours, Cameron Smith scores a double and five goals in a commanding performance against Penrith Panthers.
 3 May – Craig Bellamy coaches the NSW Country representative team in the annual City vs Country Origin held in Coffs Harbour.
 Round 8 – Melbourne suffer their first loss of the season, going down 30–12 against Wests Tigers at Gosford.
 Round 10 – Despite the loss of five players to State of Origin duty, Melbourne trounce bottom-placed Sydney Roosters 26–2, holding the Roosters tryless.
 Round 11 – In a top of the table clash at Brookvale Oval, former Storm  Matt Orford kicked the decisive field goal to give Manly Warringah Sea Eagles a dramatic 13–12 win over Melbourne. Coach Craig Bellamy could not fault the team's effort, but was critical of some options taken when the match was in the balance, saying "we were very brave, but very dumb".
 Round 13 – In the lowest scoring game for 14 years, Melbourne score a late try to win 4–2 against the New Zealand Warriors in Auckland. Missing nine regular players, including six on State of Origin duty, Melbourne trailed 2-0 for much of the game played in cold and wet conditions. Midseason signing Clint Newton made his debut for the club, becoming the 100th player to play for the club; while Matt Rua played his first NRL game since 2002.
 Round 14 – Melbourne march to a 40-4 halftime lead against North Queensland Cowboys, going on to win 58–12, eclipsing the highest score posted by the club against the Cowboys. Matt Geyer scores his 100th NRL try, becoming the first Melbourne player to reach that milestone.
 22 June – As part of the club's 10-year celebrations, a 17-man team of the decade is announced at a gala presentation held at The Great Hall of the National Gallery of Victoria.
 Round 15 – Celebrating the club's 10th birthday with fireworks and cake postgame, Melbourne dominate St George Illawarra Dragons 28–6.
 10 July – Crowd favourite Matt King announces he will be leaving Melbourne at the end of the season to join Super League club Warrington Wolves on a lucrative four-year deal.
 Round 18 – Midseason signing Clint Newton scores a try against former club Newcastle Knights as Melbourne thrash Newcastle 44–0. Billy Slater, Steve Turner, and Anthony Quinn all score double in the big win, with Newton saying the victory was "sweet (to beat) someone that wasn't playing tonight" referring to Knights coach Brian Smith.
 Round 20 – A poor attitude was blamed as Melbourne suffered a 26–16 defeat against the previously hapless Sydney Roosters, under caretaker coach Brad Fittler. Melbourne had rested Matt Geyer and Ryan Hoffman from the match.
 Round 21 – Behind 14-0 after 30 minutes, Cooper Cronk lands a late field goal to secure a 17–16 win over Cronulla-Sutherland Sharks, with Sharks coach Ricky Stuart upset over various decisions by referee Paul Simpkins.
 8 August – Long-time Melbourne recruitment officer Peter O'Sullivan is poached by Sydney Roosters in a two-year deal worth $150,000 a season.
 Round 22 – A 'grapple tackle' furore erupts after Melbourne's 14–6 win over Brisbane Broncos with Broncos captain Petero Civoniceva and coach Wayne Bennett particularly vocal in complaining.
 Round 24 – Melbourne secure their second successive minor premiership with a dominant second half performance against Canterbury-Bankstown Bulldogs. The 38–6 win came with a hat-trick of tries to Israel Folau, who in doing so equaled the club record for tries for a season.
 Round 25 – Israel Folau scores his 21st try of the season as Melbourne thrash new club Gold Coast Titans 50–6 in the first meeting between the teams. The victory saw Melbourne finish the season with a perfect 12–0 record in games played at Olympic Park.
 Preliminary Final – Returning to Telstra Dome for the first time since 2001, Melbourne progress to their second successive NRL Grand Final with a 26–10 win over Parramatta Eels.
 30 November – Cameron Smith is awarded the Golden Boot as the best player in the world.

Milestone games

Jerseys
Continuing with apparel manufacturer Reebok, the designs of Melbourne's home and clash jerseys were unchanged from 2006.

Fixtures

Pre Season

Regular season
Source:
(GP) - Golden Point extra time
(pen) - Penalty try

Finals

Ladder

2007 Coaching Staff
 Head coach: Craig Bellamy
 Assistant coaches: Michael Maguire & Stephen Kearney
 Development coach: Brad Arthur
 Specialist coach: Matthew Johns
 Strength and conditioning Coach: Alex Corvo
 Football Manager: Dean Lance

2007 Squad
List current as of 18 October 2021

2007 Grand Final Winning Team

Team of the decade
As part of their 10-year celebrations in 2007, Melbourne Storm released a team of the decade. The 17-man team was selected by former assistant coach Greg Brentnall, foundation CEO John Ribot, and then board member Frank Stanton (all 3 were members of the 1982 Kangaroo tour "Invincibles", Brentnall and Ribot as players with Stanton the coach). The trio were joined by The Daily Telegraph (Sydney) journalist Steve Mascord.

Player movements

Losses
 Matthew Bartlett to North Queensland Cowboys (midseason)
 Ian Donnelly to Gold Coast Titans (midseason)
 Jamie Feeney to Retirement
 Nathan Friend to Gold Coast Titans
 Scott Hill to Harlequins RL
 Daniel Isaac to Gold Coast Titans
 David Kidwell to South Sydney Rabbitohs
 Smith Samau to Gold Coast Titans
 Glen Turner to Canberra Raiders
 Chris Walker to Gold Coast Titans
 Jake Webster to Gold Coast Titans

Gains
 Clint Newton from Newcastle Knights (midseason)
 Anthony Quinn from Newcastle Knights

Representative honours
This table lists all players who have played a representative match in 2007.

Statistics
This table contains playing statistics for all Melbourne Storm players to have played in the 2007 NRL season.

Statistics sources:

Scorers

Most points in a game: 18 points
 Round 6 – Cameron Smith (2 tries, 5 goals) vs Penrith Panthers
 Round 14 – Cameron Smith (9 goals) vs North Queensland Cowboys

Most tries in a game: 3 
 Round 24 – Israel Folau vs Canterbury-Bankstown Bulldogs
 Qualifying Final – Steve Turner vs Brisbane Broncos

Winning games

Highest score in a winning game: 58 points 
 Round 14 vs North Queensland Cowboys

Lowest score in a winning game: 4 points
 Round 13 vs New Zealand Warriors

Greatest winning margin: 46 points 
 Round 14 vs North Queensland Cowboys

Greatest number of games won consecutively: 8
 Round 21 – Grand Final

Losing games

Highest score in a losing game: 16 points
 Round 20 vs Sydney Roosters

Lowest score in a losing game: 12 points 
 Round 8 vs Wests Tigers
 Round 11 vs Manly Warringah Sea Eagles

Greatest losing margin: 18 points
 Round 8 vs Wests Tigers

Greatest number of games lost consecutively: 1

Feeder Team
For a tenth and ultimately final season, Melbourne continued their affiliation with Norths Devils, with reserve players travelling to Brisbane each week to play with the Devils in the Queensland Cup.

Coached by former Storm player Kevin Carmichael, the Devils missed the Queensland Cup finals for the second year in a row.

Awards and honours

Trophy Cabinet
 2007 J. J. Giltinan Shield
 2007 Provan-Summons Trophy
 Michael Moore Trophy

Melbourne Storm Awards Night
Melbourne Storm Player of the Year: Cameron Smith 
 Members' Player of the Year: Billy Slater
 Best Back: Billy Slater
 Best Forward: Dallas Johnson
 Most Improved: Jeff Lima
 Rookie of the Year: Israel Folau
 Mick Moore Club Person of the Year: Matt King
 Life Member Inductee: Greg Brentnall

Dally M Awards Night
Peter Moore Rookie of the Year: Israel Folau
Dally M Representative Player of the Year: Cameron Smith
Dally M Coach of the Year: Craig Bellamy
 Dally M Top Try Scorer of the Year: Israel Folau
 Dally M Lock of the Year: Dallas Johnson

Rugby League World Golden Boot Awards Night
Golden Boot Award: Cameron Smith

RLIF Awards
RLIF International Newcomer of the Year: Israel Folau

Additional Awards
 Clive Churchill Medal: Greg Inglis
 Wally Lewis Medal: Cameron Smith
 QRL Ron McAuliffe Medal: Cameron Smith

Notes

References

Melbourne Storm seasons
Melbourne Storm